Julian Branch is a stream in Wayne County in the U.S. state of Missouri. It is a tributary of Big Lake Creek.

Julian Branch has the name of the local Julian family.

See also
List of rivers of Missouri

References

Rivers of Wayne County, Missouri
Rivers of Missouri